The Wollbachspitze is a mountain in the Zillertal Alps on the border between Tyrol, Austria, and South Tyrol, Italy.

References 
 Austrian Alpenverein 
 Alpenverein South Tyrol 

Mountains of the Alps
Mountains of Tyrol (state)
Mountains of South Tyrol
Alpine three-thousanders
Zillertal Alps
Austria–Italy border
International mountains of Europe